St Hugh's Church may refer to:

 Church of St Hugh, Charterhouse, Somerset, England
 Church of St Hugh, Durleigh, Somerset, England
 Church of St Hugh of Lincoln, Letchworth, England
 St Hugh's Church, Foolow, Derbyshire, England
 St Hugh's Church, Lincoln, Lincolnshire, England

See also
 Saint Hugh
 St Hugh's (disambiguation)